The Republican Party of Canada was founded in 1967. It nominated two candidates in the 1968 federal election in Vancouver: Gerald Guejon won 420 votes (0.9% of the total) in Vancouver Centre, and Robert Hein won 175 votes (0.5%) in Vancouver Quadra.

In 2021, Rob Carbone adopted the name for his own unregistered political party during the 2019 federal election, a group previously known as the Progressive Party. Carbone's party was endorsed by conspiracy theorist Christopher Saccoccia.

Notes

Federal political parties in Canada
Defunct political parties in Canada
Political parties established in 1967
Republicanism in Canada